is the pen name of a Japanese manga writer, best known for authoring the Death Note manga series with illustrator Takeshi Obata from 2003 to 2006, which has 30 million collected volumes in circulation. The duo's second series, Bakuman. (2008–2012), was also successful with 15 million in circulation. In 2014, Ohba collaborated with My Little Monster creator Robico for the one-shot "Skip! Yamada-kun". Another series with Obata, Platinum End, was serialized in the monthly Jump SQ from November 4, 2015, to January 4, 2021.

Identity
Ohba's real identity is a closely guarded secret. Ohba said they never thought of becoming a manga creator, expecting the Death Note pilot to be passed on by Weekly Shōnen Jump. They have since cited Shotaro Ishinomori, Fujiko Fujio, and Fujio Akatsuka as manga creators by whom they are heavily inspired. Despite being an author, Ohba does not read much, instead they watch a lot of movies, being especially fond of those by Akira Kurosawa and Charlie Chaplin. They cited comedy as their favorite genre, and prefer Japanese films to American ones. The author described themselves as a "clean freak" and usually cleans once a day. Ohba is fond of art lithographs, collects teacups, and develops manga plots while holding their knees on a chair, the last being similar to a habit of L, one of the main characters of Death Note.

There is speculation that Tsugumi Ohba is a pen name of manga artist Hiroshi Gamo, notably by Toshio Okada. Among other supposed hidden clues in Ohba's works, supporters of the theory point out that in Bakuman the main character's uncle was a one-hit wonder manga artist who worked on a gag superhero manga, similar to Gamo and Tottemo! Luckyman, and also that the storyboards drawn by Ohba resemble Tottemo! Luckyman in style.

Works 
 Death Note with Takeshi Obata (2003–2006)
Centers on high school student Light Yagami, who discovers a supernatural notebook that allows him to kill anyone by writing the victim's name (and knowing their face). The plot follows his attempt to create and lead a world "cleansed of evil" which he will rule as "God" using the notebook, and the conflicts between himself and anyone he sees as an obstacle, from law enforcement to the mafia to the greatest detective in the world.
 Bakuman with Takeshi Obata (2008–2012)
Revolves around two high school students who team up to try to create a successful manga, so it will be made into an anime in order for the artist of the group, Moritaka Mashiro, to fulfill the promise he made to a girl named Miho Azuki, whose dream is to become a voice actress for anime, as well as the dream of Akito Takagi, the writer of the duo.
  with Robico (2014)
 Platinum End with Takeshi Obata (2015–2021)

Awards and nominations
 2007 Nominated – Tezuka Osamu Cultural Prize Grand Prize for Death Note
 2008 Nominated – Angoulême International Comics Festival Official Selection for Death Note
 2008 Won – Eagle Award for Favourite Manga for Death Note
 2010 Nominated – Manga Taishō for Bakuman.

References

External links 
 

Death Note
Living people
Manga artists from Tokyo
21st-century pseudonymous writers
Unidentified people
Year of birth missing (living people)
Manga writers